Richard McEvoy (born 13 June 1979) is an English professional golfer who plays on the European Tour. In July 2018, he had his third Challenge Tour win, the Le Vaudreuil Golf Challenge and then won the Porsche European Open, on the European Tour, the following week.

Amateur career
McEvoy's amateur wins included the 2001 Lytham Trophy, and the 2001 Irish Amateur Open Championship. He was a member of the 2001 Great Britain & Ireland Walker Cup team, and turned professional at the end of the year.

Professional career
McEvoy won two third-tier PGA EuroPro Tour events in 2002, before gaining a European Tour card at the 2003 final qualifying school where he was also medalist. He has played several seasons on the tour, but never made enough money in a season to retain his card, until 2010. He regained privileges via the second tier Challenge Tour Rankings in 2005, having won the Panasonic Panama Open during that season, qualifying school in 2006 and through the Challenge Tour again in 2009.

McEvoy's victory at the 2018 Porsche European Open came in his 285th European Tour start and only after he birdied the last hole. He was the first since Martin Wiegele in 2010 to follow a Challenge Tour win with a European Tour win. Prior to his win, McEvoy had never finished better than 3rd in an event or 101st in the Race to Dubai, only kept his European Tour Card twice, and had gone to Q school 12 times during his 17-year professional career.

Amateur wins
2001 Lytham Trophy, Irish Amateur Open Championship

Professional wins (6)

European Tour wins (1)

Challenge Tour wins (3)

1Co-sanctioned by the Tour de las Américas

PGA EuroPro Tour wins (2)

Results in major championships

CUT = missed the half-way cut
"T" = tied for place

Team appearances
Amateur
European Youths' Team Championship (representing England): 2000 (winners)
European Amateur Team Championship (representing England): 2001
Walker Cup (representing Great Britain & Ireland): 2001 (winners)

See also
2005 Challenge Tour graduates
2006 European Tour Qualifying School graduates
2009 Challenge Tour graduates
2012 European Tour Qualifying School graduates
2014 European Tour Qualifying School graduates
2015 European Tour Qualifying School graduates
2016 European Tour Qualifying School graduates

External links

English male golfers
European Tour golfers
People from Shoeburyness
1979 births
Living people